Cladich is a scattered settlement in Argyll, Scotland.

Cladich lies on the B840 road just to the west of its junction with the main A819.

External links 

Brief history
Its page in the Gazetteer for Scotland

Villages in Argyll and Bute